The following is a list of characters from the Yu-Gi-Oh! anime series, Yu-Gi-Oh! Go Rush!!.

Characters

Main Characters
Yudias Velgear

An alien from the Velgear Star Cluster, he was forced to flee his home and learned about Rush Dueling, which he believes can lead his friends and comrades to a new future.

He believes a mysterious substance, Earthdamar, was stolen from him by aliens, and has been searching for aliens ever since to retrieve it. He runs the Alien Trouble Consultancy with his twin sister Yuamu.

Yuhi's younger twin sister. She is the president of the Alien Trouble Consultancy.

A member of the Organization for Monitoring Interstellar Kriminals, dedicated to cracking down on aliens who come to Earth without proper authorization, and is partnered with Nyandestar, who he makes daily rounds with.

An alien from the Velgear Star Cluster, he was Yudias' superior officer and disappeared in battle but reappears on Earth through unknown circumstances with an interest in Rush Duels.

UTS
The , or UTS for short, is a corporate entity run by Yuamu and Yuhi that specializes in getting rid of troublesome aliens.

A veteran member of UTS and is the primary caretaker of Yuhi and Yuamu.

MIK
The , or MIK for short, is a corporate entity that cracks down on aliens that have come to Earth without proper authorization. They are also responsible for monitoring aliens that live on Earth in designated areas.

A cat partnered with Manabu and helps him find aliens with their shining eyes, she used to be partnered with Ranran, it was later revealed that’s she’s not really a cat, her true form was shown when she dueled Manabu, she comes from the planet Pawtner, she escaped when the Great King of Terror froze her planet.

Serving as the head of the MIK headquarters, Ranran surveys the Alien Residential Area.

Mutsuba Town

The president of Mutsuba Heavy Machinery.
Makeru Kurimoto

The host of Mutsuba Cable TV.
Miranda Ichimaru

The only camera operator of Mutsuba Cable TV.

Aliens

An alien who comes to Mutsuba Town, and apparently has a connection to Yuhi.

An alien who comes to Mutsuba Town and is described as being obsessed with strength.

An alien currently in Manya's care, who initially came to Mutsuba Town to eliminate the Sogetsu Clan, until he had a change of heart after coming in contact with Manabu.

An alien who works for Zuwijo, she was in love with him, until he abandoned her.

An alien from the Jersey Devil Planet, currently residing in the Alien Residential Area of Mutsuba Town alongside his younger brothers.

An alien, residing in the Alien Residential Area of Mutsuba Town, who works as an informant and shows an interest in Yudias.

Rovian Bandits
The Rovian Bandits is an organization of ruffians who strike terror into the aliens in the underground sector of the Alien Residential Area.

The queen of the Badloon Castle and the leader of the "Rovian Bandits".

The current president of Goha Enterprises, she’s Rovian’s childhood friend and love interest.

Other Characters

Yuamu's childhood friend who moved away from Mutsuba Town to become an actress.

Manya's manager, and Rovian’s cousin, he’s also a member of the Rovian Bandits.

References

Go Rush!! Characters
Yu-Gi-Oh Go Rush